The Cyclops is a 1957 science fiction horror film written, produced and directed by Bert I. Gordon, starring James Craig, Lon Chaney Jr. and Gloria Talbott.

The theme of a monster created as a result of radioactivity was a common one in the 1950s.

Plot
Test pilot Bruce Barton is missing and his girlfriend, Susan Winter, organizes a search party, which is sent out in the jungles of Mexico.

The team of scientist Russ Bradford, mining expert Martin "Marty" Melville, and pilot Lee Brand fly into unknown territory.

While searching the area, however, they uncover giant mutated Earth animals such as a mouse, an eagle, a mygale, a green iguana, a tegu and a boa.

More importantly, they encounter a mutated 25-ft tall, one-eyed human monster who became disfigured due to an exposure to radioactivity from massive radium deposits in the area. This is responsible for the unusual size of all the other giant inhabitants of the region. He kills Melville, but appears to recognize the girl.

When the cyclops tries to prevent the rest of the group from flying to safety, he is wounded and presumably dies.

Cast
As appearing in The Cyclops (main roles and screen credits identified):

 James Craig as Russ Bradford
 Gloria Talbott as Susan Winter
 Lon Chaney Jr. (credited as Lon Chaney) as Martin "Marty" Melville 
 Tom Drake as Lee Brand
 Duncan Parkin as Bruce Barton, the Cyclops
 Vincente Padula as The governor
 Marlene Kloss as Salesgirl
 Manuel López as Policeman
 Paul Frees as vocal effects for The Cyclops

Production
The main leads, Craig, Drake and Talbott signed up for the independent production, which was initially going to be a RKO production, but financing fell through. The producer/director worked feverishly to complete the film before money ran out, with only five or six days allotted to shooting. Not making things any easier was having to contend with Lon Chaney Jr. who was habitually drunk. Duncan Parkin also played Col. Manning in the War of the Colossal Beast (1958), the sequel to The Amazing Colossal Man (1957), basically playing the same disfigured giant in both films.

Production effects in The Cyclops were limited to backscreen projection, rudimentary matte work, and incorporating large images into the scenes. In the film, there is a scene in which the creature grabs Susan, but he also grabs the background as well, revealing the black color behind it. The discovery of the test pilot's aircraft involves dissimilar and haphazard debris scattered about in the form of a light aircraft wing, a P-51 Mustang canopy and a radial engine.

Reception
The Cyclops was released as a double feature with Daughter of Dr. Jekyll, which also starred Gloria Talbott. Film critic Leonard Maltin in Leonard Maltin's 2012 Movie Guide (2011) dismissed the film as "Nothing much in this cheapie."

See also
 List of American films of 1957

References

Notes

Citations

Bibliography

 Craig, Rob. It Came from 1957: A Critical Guide to the Year's Science Fiction, Fantasy and Horror Films. Jefferson, North Carolina: McFarland & Company, 2013. .
 Maltin, Leonard. Leonard Maltin's 2012 Movie Guide. New York: Signet, 2011. . 
 Palmer, Randy. Paul Blaisdell, Monster Maker: A Biography of the B Movie Makeup and Special Effects Artist. Jefferson, North Carolina: McFarland & Company, 2009. .
 Telotte, J. P. Science Fiction Film (Genres in American Cinema). New York: Cambridge University Press, 2004. . 
 Wingrove, David. Science Fiction Film Source Book. London: Longman Group Limited, 1985. .

External links

 
 

1957 films
1957 horror films
1950s science fiction horror films
Allied Artists films
American monster movies
American science fiction horror films
Films about size change
American aviation films
1950s English-language films
Films about giants
Films directed by Bert I. Gordon
Films scored by Albert Glasser
Films set in Mexico
Films set in jungles
Giant monster films
1950s American films